Billy Howard is an English comedian and impressionist, who appeared on the ITV series Who Do You Do? in the early 1970s, alongside other impressionists such as Faith Brown.

Howard was born in Edgware, London, England. He commenced his musical career as a jazz trumpeter and guitarist, playing in jazz combos in the early 1960s. In 1976, his single "King of the Cops", a comic version of the hit "King of the Road", reached No. 6 in the UK Singles Chart; it featured his impressions of TV cops including Kojak, Columbo, Steve McGarrett in Hawaii Five-O, McCloud, Ironside and Cannon. Several months later, a follow-up, "The Disco Cops", was also released, but did not chart. Another comic record by Howard, "Frantic Frog (Parts 1 and 2)", was released in 1977 and also failed to chart.

Discography

References

Year of birth missing (living people)
Living people
English male comedians
English comedy musicians
English impressionists (entertainers)
English jazz trumpeters
English jazz guitarists